Copenhagen Game Collective (CGC) is a multi-gender, multi-national, non-profit game design collective based in Copenhagen, Denmark. The collective comprises a tight network of different companies, non-commercial projects, and creative individuals.

CGC creates games of all types: browser-based games, pervasive games, card games, board games, wiimote games, social network games, mods, interactive stories, and other hybrids.

Copenhagen Game Collective has organized several game related events, including the first games and play festival in Copenhagen called w00t.

Research 

Some research papers and studies are done or published in relation to CGC, including:

 P. Jarnfelt, S. Selvig, D. Dimovska. Towards Tailoring Player Experience in Physical Wii Games: A Case Study on Relaxation. In Proceedings of the International Conference on Advances in Computer Entertainment Technology Conference (ACE ‘09). Athens, Greece. October, 2009.
 D. Wilson, D. Dimovska, S. Selvig, P. Jarnfelt. Face-off in the Magic Circle: Getting Players to Look at Each Other, not the Screen. In Proceedings of the International Conference on Advances in Computer Entertainment Technology Conference (ACE ‘09). Athens, Greece. October, 2009.
 D. Wilson, M. Sicart. Abusing the Player, and Making Them Like it Too! In Proceedings of the Digital Games Research Association (DiGRA ‘09). London, UK. September, 2009.
 D. Dimovska, S. Selvig, P. Jarnfelt. Towards Tailoring the Emotional Experience in a Physical Wii Game through Artificial Neural Networks based on Physiology and Gesture Data. Masters Thesis, IT University of Copenhagen. Copenhagen, Denmark. August, 2009.

Games 

A number of games were developed by the CGC, including:

 Face-off in the Magic Circle
 Where is my Heart?
 B.U.T.T.O.N
 Mutatione
 Collectible Business Card Game
 Train Mafia
 Game Studies Card Game
 5 Minute MMORPG
 Dark Room
 Magnetize Me
 Idiots Attack the Top Noodle

References

External links 
 http://www.copenhagengamecollective.org/

Organizations based in Copenhagen